The South African Air Force Museum houses exhibits and restores material related to the history of the South African Air Force. The museum is divided into three locations, AFB Swartkop outside Pretoria, AFB Ysterplaat in Cape Town and at the Port Elizabeth airport.

Exhibits

AFB Swartkop
AFB Swartkop is home to the headquarters and largest of the three museum locations, occupying at least five hangars.

It contains a number of Dassault Mirage IIIs, Dassault Mirage F1s, Atlas Cheetahs and various other historical aircraft as well as aviation-related items on display such as ejection seats, uniforms, aircraft engines, aircraft weaponry and a Cheetah C flight simulator.

Aircraft on display
 Aerospatiale Alouette III
 Aerospatiale Puma
 Aerospatiale Super Frelon
 Atlas Cheetah E
 Atlas Cheetah C
 Atlas Impala Mk.I
 Atlas Impala Mk.II
 Atlas XH-1 Alpha
 Avro Shackleton
 Blackburn Buccaneer
 Boeing 707
 Canadair CL-13
 Douglas DC-4
 Dassault Mirage III BZ
 Dassault Mirage III CZ
 Dassault Mirage III RZ
 English Electric Canberra T Mk.4
 Fieseler Storch
 Lockheed Ventura
 Mikoyan MiG-21
 Mirage F1 AZ
 North American Harvard
 North American Mustang
 Patchen Explorer
 Paterson Biplane
 Pilatus PC-7 Mk.II
 Westland Wasp

AFB Ysterplaat
AFB Ysterplaat is home to the last airworthy Avro Shackleton. The Shackleton has been grounded for several years already though, as there are not enough qualified aircrew and the remaining airframe hours are insufficient to train new crew, apart from the obvious concern of preservation of this historic aircraft.

The Douglas C-47 Dakota here, is the aircraft used in 1952 by the SAAF to help Professor J. L. B. Smith acquire a coelacanth fish specimen from the Comoros Islands.

Aircraft on display
 Avro Shackleton
 Canadair CL-13
 Dassault Mirage F1 CZ
 Dassault Mirage III R2Z
 de Havilland Vampire
 Douglas C-47
 Lockheed Ventura 
 North American Harvard
 Piaggio P.166
 Westland Wasp

Port Elizabeth
There are few exhibits at the Port Elizabeth Airport branch of the museum because of the limited hangar space available.

Static exhibits are housed in the original 42-Air School Air Gunnery Training Centre used during the Joint Air Training Scheme in World War II.

Aircraft on display
 Aerospatiale Alouette III
 Aerospatiale Puma
 Atlas Impala Mk.II
 Mirage F1 CZ
 North American Harvard
 de Havilland Vampire
 Westland Wasp
 Supermarine Spitfire 1:1 Scale model built out of wood.

Active restoration is being performed on a number of North American Harvards and there is a project to restore an Airspeed Oxford.
One of the more unusual exhibits is a Jorg IV Skimmerfoil ground-effect craft.

See also

 List of aerospace museums
 Military history of South Africa
 South African Air Force
 South African National Museum of Military History
 South African Naval Museum
 AFB Swartkop

References

External links

 Official website
 Swartkops Museum website
 Friends of the SAAF Museum Society

Air force museums
South African Air Force
Military and war museums in South Africa
Museums in Cape Town
Museums in Pretoria
Aerospace museums in South Africa
Port Elizabeth